Brandon Fletcher (born April 2, 1987) is an Internet entrepreneur.

Date unknown

At 20, Fletcher became one of the first content creators on the Internet to sign a revenue sharing deal with YouTube.

Fletcher created Date Unknown, an online-based reality show that films "the first dates of people who meet online." He executive-produced and funded the project himself. The show was filmed throughout the New York City, San Francisco, and Los Angeles areas. It has been compared to traditional television shows such as "Blind Date." The tenth episode has received 1.7 million views to date.

References

External links
Official site

Living people
1987 births
People from Boynton Beach, Florida